The Profession of Arms can refer to:

 The Profession of Arms (1983 film), a 1983 Canadian film
 The Profession of Arms (2001 film), a 2001 Italian film